Freda Tuki Soriocomua (usually referred to as Freda Soria Comua) is a politician of Solomon Islands who served as Minister of Rural Development from 15 December 2014 to 18 August 2015 and subsequently as Minister of Women, Youth, and Children's Affairs from 18 August 2015 to 8 October 2018 when she was removed from office after being found guilty of vote buying or corruption by the Solomon Islands High Court. She re-gained her seat as a Member of Parliament representing the Temotu Vatud constituency at the 2019 general elections.

Soria Comua was the only successful female candidate in the 2014 general elections and one of two in the 2019 general elections, the other being her successor as Minister of Women, Youth, and Children's Affairs, Lanelle Tanangada.

References

Year of birth missing (living people)
Living people
Women government ministers of the Solomon Islands
21st-century women politicians
Members of the National Parliament of the Solomon Islands
Women's ministers of the Solomon Islands